Liku is a village in Wallis and Futuna. It is located in Hahake District, near the east coast of Wallis Island. Its population according to the 2018 census was 605 people.

References

Populated places in Wallis and Futuna